Głusk may refer to the following places in Poland:
Głusk, a former village, now part of the city of Lublin
Gmina Głusk, a district administered from Głusk (Lublin)
Głusk, Masovian Voivodeship, a village in east-central Poland
Hlusk, an urban-type settlement in Belarus